Joseph Henry Russell Bailey, 2nd Baron Glanusk  (26 October 1864 – 11 January 1928), was a British Army officer and peer.

Early life
Bailey was the eldest son of Sir Joseph Bailey, 2nd Baronet, who was created Baron Glanusk in 1899, when his children received the style the Honourable. He succeeded his father in the barony (and baronetcy) in 1906.

Military career
On 7 February 1885 Bailey was commissioned as a lieutenant in the Grenadier Guards from the Royal Military College, Sandhurst, and he was promoted captain on 11 November 1896. After the outbreak of the Second Boer War in October 1899, a corps of imperial volunteers from London was formed in late December 1899. The corps included infantry, mounted infantry and artillery divisions and was authorized with the name City of London Imperial Volunteers. It proceeded to South Africa in January 1900, returned in October the same year, and was disbanded in December 1900. Captain Bailey was appointed as Adjutant to the infantry division on 3 January 1900, with the temporary rank of Major in the Army, and served as such until the corps was disbanded. He was promoted to the substantive rank of major on 29 November 1900, and awarded a Distinguished Service Order (DSO) for his services in South Africa later the same year. After his return to the United Kingdom, he was on 1 June 1901 appointed to command the Guards' depot at Caterham, Surrey. 

He retired from the Grenadier Guards in 1903, and became Lieutenant-Colonel commanding the part-time 3rd (Royal South Wales Borderers Militia) Battalion, South Wales Borderers, on 9 April 1904. After he succeeded to the barony, he was also appointed to succeed his father as Honorary Colonel of the 1st (Brecknockshire) Volunteer Battalion, South Wales Borderers, on 1 June 1907. In a most unusual arrangement, he was later appointed the active commanding officer of the battalion (now the Brecknockshire Battalion in the Territorial Force) on 20 March 1912. On the outbreak of World War I he mobilised the battalion at Brecon and commanded it when it was deployed to Aden in December 1914. Having been appointed a CB in 1911, he was also made a CBE in 1919 at the end of the war.

Other roles
He was appointed a deputy lieutenant of Breconshire in March 1887, and succeeded his father in the appointment as Lord Lieutenant of Breconshire in 1905, a post he held until his death.

Family
Bailey married, in 1890, Editha Elma Sergison, daughter of Major Warden Sergison and they had the following children: 
 Hon Wilfred Russell Bailey,born 27 June 1891, Major, Grenadier Guards, served in World War I
 Hon Gerald Sergison Bailey, born 22 November 1893, Lieutenant, Grenadier Guards, killed in action 10 August 1915
 Hon Dulsie Editha Bailey, born 23 November 1896, married 12 May 1922 Captain Alastair Robertson Cooper, Royal Scots Greys
 Hon Bernard Michael Bailey, born 17 January 1899, Midshipman, Royal Navy, killed in action at the Battle of Jutland 31 May 1916 

Lord Glanusk died in January 1928, aged 63, leaving the ancestral home, Glanusk Park, and his titles to his son, Wilfred Bailey, 3rd Baron Glanusk. Lady Glanusk died in 1938.

Coat of arms

References

Sources
 Burke's Peerage, Baronetage and Knightage, 100th Edn, London, 1953.
Kidd, Charles, Williamson, David (editors). Debrett's Peerage and Baronetage (1990 edition). New York: St Martin's Press, 1990.

1864 births
1928 deaths
Grenadier Guards officers
Brecknockshire Militia officers
South Wales Borderers officers
Graduates of the Royal Military College, Sandhurst
Barons in the Peerage of the United Kingdom
Commanders of the Order of the British Empire
Companions of the Distinguished Service Order
Companions of the Order of the Bath
Lord-Lieutenants of Brecknockshire
Welsh landowners
Younger sons of barons